Montcel is the name of the following communes in France:

 Montcel, Puy-de-Dôme, in the Puy-de-Dôme department
 Montcel, Savoie, in the Savoie department